The tribes of Dersim are small confederations formed mostly by Zazas and spread to Eastern Anatolia, mainly Dersim. Some of the tribes belonged to crypto-Armenians and Kurds.

After the Dersim rebellion (1937–38), some of the Dersim tribes dispersed to different parts of Eastern and Central Anatolia: Adana, Adıyaman, Amasya, Ardahan, Bingöl, Diyarbakır, Elazığ, Erzincan, Erzurum, Giresun, Gümüşhane, Kahramanmaraş, Kayseri, Malatya, Muş, Sivas, Şanlıurfa, and Tokat.

Table of the tribes of Dersim

Related books 
 Dersim Tarihi (in Turkish), Ali Kaya
 Dersim Tarihi (in Turkish), Vecihi Timuroğlu
 Kürt Meselesi (in Turkish), Kâzım Karabekir
 Hatıram (in Turkish), Nuri Dersimi
 Belge ve Tanıklarıyla Dersim Direnişleri (in Turkish), M. Kalman
 Dersim Raporları (in Turkish), Faik Bulut
 Doğu'da Aşiretler, Kürtler, Aleviler (in Turkish), Burhan Kocadağ
 Derebeyi ve Dersim (in Turkish), Naşit Hakkı Uluğ, 
 Ulusal Demokratik Mücadelede Koçgiri Kürt Aşiretleri (in Turkish), Dursun Evren

References 

Tribes